"Welcome to the Family" is a song by the American heavy metal band Avenged Sevenfold. It was released on 19 October 2010, as the second single from their studio album Nightmare. It is the band's second single released without former drummer The Rev, who died on December 28, 2009. In Avenged Sevenfold's "making of" series on YouTube, In the Studio, lead singer M. Shadows and bassist Johnny Christ say that The Rev wrote most of the song and Shadows finished it when they started to record the album. The song is available as DLC in the video game Rock Band 3.

Track listing
 "Welcome to the Family" — 4:06
 "4:00 A.M." — 4:58
 "Seize the Day (Live in Seattle)" — 5:37

Personnel
Avenged Sevenfold
M. Shadows – vocals
Zacky Vengeance – rhythm guitar, backing vocals
The Rev – drum arrangement, drums and backing vocals (track 3), backing vocals on "Welcome to the Family"
Synyster Gates – lead guitar, backing vocals 
Johnny Christ – bass
Additional musicians
Mike Portnoy – drums (tracks 1 and 2)
Production
Mike Elizondo – producer
Andy Wallace – mixing
Ted Jensen – mastering
Cam Rackam – paintings and portraits

Charts

Weekly charts

Year-end charts

References

External links

Songs about families
2010 singles
Avenged Sevenfold songs
2010 songs
Warner Records singles
Songs written by The Rev
Song recordings produced by Mike Elizondo
Songs written by M. Shadows